A testimony of equality is an act, usage, or course of conduct by a member of the Religious Society of Friends (Quakers) tending to assert or promote equality of persons, arising from the Friends' belief that all people are equal in the eyes of God. The word testimony describes the way that Friends testify or bear witness to their beliefs in their everyday life.  A testimony is therefore not a belief, but is committed action arising out of Friends' religious experience.  Testimony of equality has included Quakers' participating in actions that promote the equality of the sexes and races, as well as other classifications of people.

General explanation

Friends believe that all people are equal in the eyes of God. Since all people embody the same divine spark all people deserve equal treatment. Friends were some of the first to value women as important ministers and to campaign for women's rights; they became leaders in the anti-slavery movement, and were among the first to pioneer humane treatment for individuals with mental disorders, and for prisoners.

Quakers hold a strong sense of spiritual egalitarianism, including a belief in the spiritual equality of the sexes. From the beginning both women and men were granted equal authority to speak in meetings for worship. Margaret Fell-Fox was as vocal and literate as her husband, George Fox, publishing several tracts in the early days of Quakerism.  Early Friends argued that inequality between men and women arose from the Fall from the Garden of Eden, but that since Christ has come to redeem our sins, this inequality should no longer stand.  For example, George Fox wrote in 1674:

Friends' attitude towards egalitarianism is also demonstrated by their refusal to practice "hat honour" (Quakers refused to take their hats off or bow to anyone regardless of title or rank), and their rejection of styles and titles (such as Mr, Mrs, Lord, Dr, etc.), simply calling everyone by their first and last name only (i.e. John Smith rather than Mr Smith or Sir John). This testified to the Friends' understanding that, in the eyes of God, there was no hierarchy based on birth, wealth, or political power—such honours they reserved only for God. This practice was not considered by Friends to be anti-authoritarian in nature, but instead as a rebuke against human pretense and ego.

Today, resistance to "hat honour" does not prevail as it once did—most hat customs are not practiced in contemporary daily life—and the individual Friend is left to decide whether or not to practice "hat honour" as a matter of conscience.

Equality of the sexes

Friends were some of the first to value women as spiritual ministers. Elizabeth Hooton was possibly the first person to be convinced by George Fox and was an outspoken and daring preacher during the earliest days of the movement.  Margaret Fell was another early leader of the Friends movement. The first two people who went to what is now the United States to promote the Quaker Faith were Mary Fisher and Ann Austin.

At one time it was common for male and female Quakers to have separate Meetings for Business. This practice was considered to give the women more power and was not meant to demean them. During the 18th century, some Quakers felt that women were not participating fully in Meetings for Business as most women would not "nay-say" their husbands. The solution was to form the two separate Meetings for Business. Many Quaker meeting houses were built with a movable divider down the middle. During Meetings for Worship, the divider was raised. During Business meetings the divider was lowered, creating two rooms. Each gender ran their own separate business meetings. Any issue which required the consent of the whole meeting—building repairs for example—would involve sending an emissary to the other meeting. This practice continued until there was no longer a concern over whether women would "nay-say" their husbands; some very old meetinghouses still have this divider, although it likely is nonmovable.

In addition, many of the leaders in the women's suffrage movement in the United States in the 19th century were drawn from the Quakers, including Susan B. Anthony and Lucretia Mott.

Racial equality
Friends also eventually became leaders in the anti-slavery movement, although a realization of the wrongness of slavery did not develop for almost a century. In the 18th century John Woolman began to stir the conscience of Friends concerning the owning of slaves.  Some, such as Benjamin Lay, used immoderate tracts and shock tactics to encourage speedy rejection of both slave ownership and participation in the slave trade.  

In 1776, the Philadelphia Yearly Meeting (the most important yearly meeting in USA at the time) prohibited members from owning slaves, and on February 11, 1790, Friends petitioned the U.S. Congress for the abolition of slavery. American Friends were prominent participants in the Underground Railroad, a transportation network for sending escaped slaves to freedom.

Humane treatment of the mentally ill
Quakers were among the first to pioneer humane treatment for the mentally ill, with The Retreat, in York, England, an asylum set up by William Tuke (1732–1822) as a reaction to the harsh nature of 18th century asylum care.

Humane treatment of prisoners
In the 19th Century Elizabeth Fry and her brother, Joseph John Gurney, campaigned for the humane treatment of prisoners. Fry went into prisons herself to provide food, blankets, education, and other assistance to the prisoners. They were able to persuade Members of Parliament to pass reform legislation to improve prison conditions.  They also were able to influence legislation that reduced the number of crimes that were punishable by death.

In the 1960s, a Friend, Eric Baker, took part in the founding of Amnesty International, a human rights group primarily focused on the treatment of those in prison and those accused of crimes.  It is not directly connected with the Religious Society of Friends but has similar ideals as those derived from the Testimony of Equality.

See also
Humanitarianism
Quakers
Quaker views of homosexuality

References

Quaker practices
Quaker theology
Christianity and women
Quaker abolitionism
Christianity and capital punishment